John Campbell of Sorn in Ayrshire was a 17th-century nonconforming minister of the gospel.

He was charged in an Edinburgh court for attending a service of worship at the house of James Campbell (vintner) and Thomas Waddell during the hours of Sunday morning worship. He was imprisoned on the Bass Rock on the Firth of Forth in Haddingtonshire.

He was admitted to Sorn  about  1658  but was subsequently  deprived by  Act  of  Parliament  11  June,  and Decreet  of  Privy  Council  1  October  1662. He was  summoned  to  appear  before  a  committee of  the  Diocesan  Synod, on  28  April 1664,  for  nonconformity. He returned  in  1672.

Campbell had  an  indulgence  along  with  the preceding,  from  the  Privy  Council on 3  September 1672,  but  having  preached  at conventicles  in  1678,  was  accused  of  treason before  the  Lords  of  Justiciary,  and  remitted by  them  to  the  Privy  Council  on 19  December  1683. Admitting  he  had  broken  his  confinement, officiated  in  private  families,  and had  not  read  the  Proclamation  for  the thanksgiving,  his  indulgence  was  revoked on 3  January  1684,  and  he  was  imprisoned  on  failure  to  find  caution  in  5000  merks  that  he  would  not  frequent  conventicles,  baptize, or  marry. But  on  his  petition  that  he could  not  possibly  find  such  caution,  he  was  liberated  on  undertaking  not  to  transgress in  these  matters,  24  January  1684.

References

Citations

Sources

17th-century Ministers of the Church of Scotland
Covenanters
Year of birth missing
Year of death missing